Agestrata is a genus of scarab beetles (insects of the family Scarabaeidae).

Selected species
 Agestrata alexisi Devecis, 2004 
 Agestrata arnaudi Allard, 1990 
 Agestrata dehaani Gory & Percheron, 1833 
 Agestrata orichalca (Linnaeus, 1789) 
 Agestrata semperi Mohnike, 1873

References

Scarabaeidae genera